Elvire Murail (born 7 June 1958, in Le Havre) is a French writer, mainly author of books for youth under the pen name Moka. The daughter of poet , she is the younger sister of writers Marie-Aude and Lorris Murail, and composer Tristan Murail.

Biography 
A graduate of University of Cambridge, she began her literary career with adult novels. She enjoyed success with her first book, Escalier C, which was brought to the cinema by Jean-Charles Tacchella in 1984.

After signing four novels for adults, she entered youth literature in 1989 under the pseudonym Moka. These novels were for the most part books of mysteries between police and fantasy for adolescents from 10 to 15 years old.

Since 1996, she has been committed to defending a quality youth literature within the "Charte des Auteurs et Illustrateurs pour la Jeunesse" of which she was treasurer from 1999 to 2007. She was also the Permanent Commissioner for General Affairs of Sofia until 2007. She is a member of the Société des gens de lettres and the société des auteurs et compositeurs dramatiques.

She also works as a screenwriter and dialogue writer for film and television.

Literary works

Under her name 
1983: Escalier C
1984: La Plume de perroquet
1987: Les Mannequins d'osier
1990: Bingo !

Under the pseudonym Moka 

 La Lanterne bleue, 1991, illustrations by Yvan Pommaux
 Ailleurs (trilogy)
 Ailleurs, rien n'est tout blanc ou tout noir, 1991
 Le puits d'amour, 1992
 A nous la belle vie, 1994
 Je m'excuse, 1992, illustrations by Serge Bloch
 Ma vie de star, 1992, illustrations by Olivier Matouk
 Chipies et les Inventeurs, 1992, illustrations by Fabienne Teyssèdre
 Un phare dans le ciel, 1993
 Thomas Face-de-Rat et Amélie Mélasse, 1993, illustrations by Mette Ivers
 Souï-Manga, 1993, illustrations by Joëlle Jolivet
 L'enfant des ombres, 1994
 Trois-Pommes, 1994, illustrations by Catherine Rebeyrol Nous, les filles, 1995, illustrations by Éric Heliot
 Ma vengeance sera terrible, 1995, illustrations by Anaïs Vaugelade
 La marque du diable, 1996
 Mon loup, 1996, illustrations by Mette Ivers
 Derrière la porte, 1997
 La chose qui ne pouvait pas exister, 1997
 Ah, la famille !, 1997, illustrations Mette Ivers
 Un ange avec des baskets , 1998
 Williams et nous, 1998
 Vilaine fille, 1999
 Bon à rien, 1999, illustrations Catherine Rebeyrol
 Cela, 2000
 L'écolier assassin, 2000
 Joséphine a disparu, 2000, illustrations Edith
 Le Plus grand détective du monde, 2000, illustrations Jean-François Martin
 Le Dernier cadeau du Père Noël, 2000, with Marie-Aude Murail, illustrations Stéphane Jorisch
 La chambre du pendu, 2001
 Le Poisson dans le bocal, 2001, illustrations Isabelle Bonameau
 Au pied de l'Arc-en-ciel, 2001, illustrations  Catharina Valckx
 Le petit cœur brisé, 2002
 Un sale moment à passer, 2002
 Drôle de voleur !, 2002, illustrations Isabelle Bonameau
 Golem, serial cowritten with Marie-Aude Murail and Lorris Murail.
 Magic Berber
 Joke
 Natacha
 Monsieur William
 Alias
 L'Esprit de la fôret, 2003
 Arthus et Pénélope
 Le mystère de la Ferté-des-Eaux, 2002
 Amour et trahison, 2003
 Bonne année ?, 2003
 Do you speak français ?, 2004
 Vive la révolution !, 2003, illustrations Frédéric Rébéna
 Jeu mortel, 2003
 Les Malheurs d'Hortense, 2003, illustrations Magali Bonniol
 Il était trois fois, 2003, illustrations by Denise and Claude Millet
 Jusqu'au bout de la peur, 2004
 Tango, 2004
 Pourquoi ?, 2005
 Histoires de fées, 2006, illustrations Alice Charbin
 Sorcier ! 
 Menteurs, charlatans et soudards, 2006
 Le Frélampier, 2006
 Le Premier Temps du Chaos, 2007
 L'Honorable et le Monarque, 2007
 L'Étoile, 2008
 Les Quatre Dragons, 2008
 Secrets et confiture, 2008
 La fin du Monde, 2009
 C'est l'aventure, collective, 2010
 Frissons
 La Prophétie de Venise, 2012
 L'Immortel, 2013
 Kinra girls (12 volumes), illustrations Anne Cresci

Filmography

Cinema 
1985: Escalier C directed by Jean-Charles Tacchella, (co-screenwriter and dialogue writer)
1988:  directed by Magali Clément, (assistant screenwriter)
1988: La Septième dimension, directed by six co-directors, (co-screenwriter and assistant screenwriter)
1989: Les Mannequins d'osier directed by Francis de Gueltzl, (screenwriter and dialogue writer)
1993: Une journée pour rien by Serge Halsdorf, (screenwriter and dialogue writer)

Television 
1993: Chambre froide, directed by Sylvain Madigan, (adaptation and dialogues)
1996: Un monde meilleur, directed by Laurent Dussaux, (screenwriter-assistant dialogue writer)
1997: , directed by Lisa del Bo, (screenwriter-dialogue writer)
1997: Un étrange héritage, directed by Laurent Dussaux, (screenwriter-assistant dialogue writer)

Prizes and awards 
 Prix du premier roman for 'Escalier C, 1983
 Prix George Sand for Escalier C, 1984
 Prix des Incorruptibles
 Tam-tam  Prix du Polar
 Grand prix de l'Imaginaire
 Prix des Embouquineurs
 Prix de la SNCF for Pourquoi ?She received twice a scholarship from the National Center for Letters for Un phare dans le ciel'' and for the whole of her work for youth.

References

External links 
 Elvire Murail on Babelio
 Official website of the author
 Elvire Murail on École des Loisirs
 Elvire Murail on Ricochet-Jeunes

1958 births
Writers from Le Havre
20th-century French non-fiction writers
French children's writers
French women children's writers
French women screenwriters
French screenwriters
Prix du premier roman winners
Living people
20th-century French women writers